South Carolina Highway 193 (SC 193) is a  state highway in the U.S. state of South Carolina. The highway connects Ward and rural areas of Saluda County.

Route description
SC 193 begins at an intersection with SC 23 (Front Street) in Ward, within Saluda County, where the roadway continues as Mt. Alpha Road. It travels to the north-northwest and leaves town. It crosses over Dry Creek. After it curves to the northwest, it crosses over Mine Creek and Little Mine Creek in quick succession. The highway passes Saluda County Airport just before meeting its northern terminus, an intersection with SC 121, south-southwest of Saluda, where the roadway continues as Gabe Road.

Major intersections

See also

References

External links

SC 193 at Virginia Highways' South Carolina Highways Annex

193
Transportation in Saluda County, South Carolina